A dart injection is used to give a single intramuscular or subcutaneous injection to livestock without restraining the animal.  It can be contrasted with hand injection. These injections are usually administered by a tranquilliser gun, if in the wild, or sometimes a blowgun if in captivity.

Notes

Veterinary procedures